Ultrabeat are a Swedish electronic music group, fronted by Erik Augustsson. The group is classified as contemporary Christian music, with the motto "making phat beats for Jesus Christ".

Discography
Ultrabeat has released three albums through BEC Recordings.

Trip to a Planet Called Heaven
(Released 1-25-2000)

Love (flying higher remix)
Pure Heart
Wake Up!
Revolution
Free Like That Wind (party remix)
Madness
The Truth is Out There...
My Dream
World of Light
The Journey
I Wanna Live 4 Him

Beyond the Stars
(Released 1-23-2001)

Interlude
jesusrave ( eurotrance mix)
like a star
galaxy 21
deeper than oceans
more than i could say
higher ( into your light)
rave on ( exploring green planets club mix)
starfield ( fantasy landscape mix)
i can fly
divine flow
energy boost
night in heaven
paradise island of dreams
prince of light

E-Praise
(Released 2002)

Shine Thru My Life
(Released 5-6-2003)

Shine Through My Life
Earth
Like Dust In The Wind
I Need You
Time Is On My Side
For You Forever
Going To The Danceparty
I Want To Live For You Again
Adventure
All I Have Is You

External links
 

Swedish musical groups
Christian musical groups